12444 Prothoon  is a large Jupiter trojan from the Trojan camp, approximately  in diameter. It was discovered on 15 April 1996, by Belgian astronomer Eric Elst at the La Silla Observatory in northern Chile. The assumed C-type asteroid is one of the 60 largest Jupiter trojans and has a rotation period of 15.82 hours. It was named after Prothoon from Greek mythology.

Orbit and classification 

Prothoon is a dark Jovian asteroid orbiting in the trailering Trojan camp at Jupiter's  Lagrangian point, 60° behind on the Gas Giant's orbit in a 1:1 resonance (see Trojans in astronomy). This asteroid is not a member of any asteroid family but belongs to the Jovian background population. It orbits the Sun at a distance of 4.9–5.6 AU once every 12.01 years (4,387 days; semi-major axis of 5.24 AU). Its orbit has an eccentricity of 0.07 and an inclination of 31° with respect to the ecliptic. The body's observation arc begins with a precovery taken at La Silla in March 1996, one month prior to its official discovery observation.

Physical characteristics 

Prothoon is an assumed C-type asteroid.

Rotation period 

In August 2011, a rotational lightcurve of Prothoon was obtained from photometric observations by Robert Stephens at the Goat Mountain Astronomical Research Station  in California. Lightcurve analysis gave a rotation period of 15.82 hours with a brightness amplitude of 0.20 magnitude.

Diameter and albedo 

According to the surveys carried out by the Japanese Akari satellite, the NEOWISE mission of NASA's Wide-field Infrared Survey Explorer, and the Infrared Astronomical Satellite IRAS, Prothoon measures between 62.41 and 64.31 kilometers in diameter and its surface has an albedo between 0.039 and 0.052.

The Collaborative Asteroid Lightcurve Link derives an albedo of 0.0467 and a diameter of 64.41 kilometers based on an absolute magnitude of 9.9.

Naming 

This minor planet was named from Greek mythology after the Trojan warrior Prothoon, who was killed by Teucer during the Trojan War. The official naming citation was published by the Minor Planet Center on 6 January 2003.

References

External links 
 Asteroid Lightcurve Database (LCDB), query form (info )
 Dictionary of Minor Planet Names, Google books
 Discovery Circumstances: Numbered Minor Planets (10001)-(15000) – Minor Planet Center
 
 

012444
Discoveries by Eric Walter Elst
Named minor planets
19960415